John Edward Cain served in the California legislature as an Assembly member for the 8th district. During World War I he served in the United States Army.

References

United States Army personnel of World War I
1887 births
1951 deaths
Democratic Party members of the California State Assembly
20th-century American politicians